Ulrich Sarbach (born 21 April 1954) is a Swiss sports shooter. He competed in two events at the 1984 Summer Olympics.

References

1954 births
Living people
Swiss male sport shooters
Olympic shooters of Switzerland
Shooters at the 1984 Summer Olympics
Place of birth missing (living people)